John Wells (16 September 1864 – 18 April 1941) was an American member of the presiding bishopric of the Church of Jesus Christ of Latter-day Saints (LDS Church) from 1918 to 1938.

Wells was born in Carlton, Nottinghamshire, England. In 1882, he became a member of the LDS Church.

Wells and his wife Almena Thorpe emigrated to Utah Territory in 1889. He gained employment as a clerk in the office of the LDS Church's presiding bishop.

In 1918, Presiding Bishop Charles W. Nibley asked Wells to become his second counselor. When Nibley was replaced by Sylvester Q. Cannon, Wells stayed on as the second counselor in the Presiding Bishopric of the church. Wells served as a general authority until the end of Cannon's tenure in 1938.

Wells died in Salt Lake City, Utah of pyelonephritis, or pus buildup in the kidneys. He was buried at Salt Lake City Cemetery.

See also

 David A. Smith (Mormon)
 Council on the Disposition of the Tithes

Notes

References
Andrew Jenson, Latter-day Saint Biographical Encyclopedia, vol. 3, p. 791

External links
Grampa Bill's G.A. Pages: John Wells

1864 births
1941 deaths
American Latter Day Saints
British Latter Day Saints
Burials at Salt Lake City Cemetery
Converts to Mormonism
Counselors in the Presiding Bishopric (LDS Church)
Deaths from kidney disease
English emigrants to the United States
English general authorities (LDS Church)
People from Carlton, Nottinghamshire